Taishan Township is a township under the administration of Anfu County, Jiangxi, China. , it has one residential community and 7 villages under its administration.

References 

Township-level divisions of Jiangxi
Anfu County